David Benjamin James MBE (born 1 August 1970) is an English former professional footballer who played as a goalkeeper. His most recent position was manager at Kerala Blasters FC in the Indian Super League in 2018. He is also a pundit on Sky Sports football coverage.

James is fifth on the list of all-time Premier League appearances, having played in 572 top-level matches, and held the Premier League record for most clean sheets with 169 until Petr Čech surpassed this record. He holds the record for most penalties saved in Premier League history (13).

He was capped 53 times by England between 1997 and 2010, and was first choice goalkeeper during the team's Euro 2004 and the 2010 World Cup campaigns. He was appointed a Member of the Order of the British Empire (MBE) in the 2012 Birthday Honours for services to football and charity.

Having started his career with Watford, James went on to feature in the Premier League for Liverpool, Aston Villa, West Ham United, Manchester City and Portsmouth. He gained a Football League Cup winner's medal with Liverpool in 1995, an FA Cup winner's medal with Portsmouth in 2008, as well as runners-up medals with Aston Villa in 2000, Liverpool in 1996 and Portsmouth in 2010. In 2010, at the age of 39, he became the oldest goalkeeper to appear in an FA Cup Final. James dropped down a division in 2010 to play for Bristol City and later played for League One side AFC Bournemouth. He joined Icelandic side ÍBV Vestmannaeyjar in 2013 in a joint playing and coaching capacity, before officially retiring.

In October 2013, James took up a coaching position at Luton Town, the club he has supported since his childhood. The following year, he became the marquee player and manager of the newly formed Kerala Blasters. He returned to the club in 2018, being dismissed in December following an 11-match winless run.

Club career

Watford 
Born in Welwyn Garden City, Hertfordshire, James grew up supporting Luton Town. He signed as a trainee with Luton's local rivals Watford upon leaving school, and was first selected for the club's senior team in 1989. In his days as a youth player, he helped Watford win the FA Youth Cup. Following the departure of Tony Coton, James made his league debut on 25 August 1990 in a 1–2 defeat against Millwall, and his performance resulted in an England U21 call-up for a match against the Republic of Ireland. He earned a total of ten caps for the U21s.

At club level, James made 89 first-team appearances for Watford, and was named the club's Player of the Season for the 1990–91 season, when he kept goal in all 46 Second Division games as Watford escaped relegation. He was signed for £1.25m by Liverpool on 6 July 1992. In 2008, James was inducted into the Watford Hall of Fame for his services to the club.

Liverpool 
James made his Liverpool debut on 16 August 1992 in a 0–1 league defeat to Nottingham Forest. After conceding twenty goals in eleven matches in the first half of the 1993–94, he was dropped in favour of veteran Bruce Grobbelaar, but was recalled to the starting line-up and kept his first clean sheet of the season in a 1–0 away win over Arsenal on 31 January 1993, which included a penalty save from Paul Merson. He also received a runners-up medal in 1996 in the FA Cup while being on the losing side against Manchester United.

James rose to fame together with Liverpool teammates Steve McManaman, Jamie Redknapp, and Robbie Fowler, who were nicknamed the "Spice Boys" – an epithet named after the Spice Girls that was used by those who alleged the Liverpool team of the 1990s were more focused on partying than winning games. James' frequent blunders earned him the nickname Calamity James. He put down his spate of errors to an overindulgence in playing computer games that in turn affected his concentration. Despite winning the 1995 Football League Cup, James' hold on the starting position was put in jeopardy with the acquisition of Brad Friedel. On 23 June 1999, after 277 games for Liverpool, he was sold to Aston Villa for £1.8 million.

Aston Villa 
James made his Villa debut on 7 August 1999, and kept a clean sheet in a 1–0 away win over Newcastle United in the opening Premier League game. He was decisive in a penalty shoot-out against Bolton Wanderers in the 2000 FA Cup semi-final, but conceded Chelsea's winning goal in the ensuing final, the last to be staged at the old Wembley.

After just two years and 85 appearances, James moved to West Ham United for £3.5 million on 11 July 2001, signing a four-year contract. However, a serious knee injury sustained while on international duty kept him out for several months.

West Ham United 
James made his debut for West Ham on 24 November 2001 in a 1–0 home loss to Tottenham Hotspur. In 2002–03, West Ham were relegated to the First Division. James stayed with West Ham at the start of the 2003–04 season before returning to the Premier League, signing for Manchester City on 14 January 2004 for an undisclosed fee as a replacement for the retired David Seaman. He played 102 total games in all competitions for West Ham.

Manchester City 

James made his Manchester City debut on 17 January 2004 in a 1–1 home draw with Blackburn Rovers. City won only four of the seventeen matches that James started, two of which came after James saved penalties against Wolverhampton Wanderers and Leicester City. James said that exploring the field of sport psychology improved his skills as a goalkeeper, particularly saving penalty kicks.

On the last day of the 2004–05 season, James was playing for City who needed to beat Middlesbrough to qualify for the UEFA Cup at the opposition's expense. With five minutes remaining the score was 1–1, when City's manager Stuart Pearce replaced midfielder Claudio Reyna with the substitute goalkeeper Nicky Weaver, and James was moved to play in attack for the remainder of the game. The unusual tactic almost worked when, in injury time, Middlesbrough defender Franck Queudrue conceded a penalty by handling a cross that was aimed at James. However, Robbie Fowler's penalty was saved by Middlesbrough goalkeeper Mark Schwarzer and so Middlesbrough not City qualified for the UEFA Cup.

On 10 August 2006, James, who had separated from his wife, stated that he needed to leave Manchester City to be closer to his children, who lived in London. Manchester City confirmed they had accepted a bid from Portsmouth. Two days later, he joined Portsmouth for £1.2 million, signing a two-year deal.

Portsmouth 

James kept clean sheets in his first five appearances for Portsmouth. On 22 April 2007, James kept his 142nd Premier League clean sheet in a goalless draw with Aston Villa, breaking the record of 141 previously held by David Seaman. At the end of 2006–07, James was named Portsmouth's player of the season.

James has made the most league appearances of any goalkeeper since the formation of the Premier League over fifteen seasons, in addition to conceding the most goals. On 30 January 2008, in a league match against Manchester United, he became the third player (after Gary Speed and Ryan Giggs) to cross the 500-match threshold.

James signed a one-year contract extension in May 2007, which kept him at Fratton Park until the end of the 2008–09 season. James won the second major trophy of his career during that season, as Portsmouth claimed a 1–0 victory over Cardiff City at Wembley Stadium in the 2008 FA Cup Final. On 8 November 2008, he made his 100th appearance for Portsmouth.

He holds the distinction of twice having been the record holder for consecutive Premier League appearances, with 159 during his Liverpool days from February 1994 to February 1998, and 166 between Manchester City and Portsmouth from 2006 to 2008; both streaks were eventually topped by Chelsea's Frank Lampard and Tottenham Hotspur's Brad Friedel, respectively.

James had the significant distinction of being named as the Goalkeeper in the PFA Premier League Team of the Year in 2008, one of only 2 players outside the "Big 4" clubs to be named.

On 14 February 2009 against Manchester City, James made his 536th Premier League appearance, breaking Gary Speed's all-time record.

On 22 April 2009, Times Online named James as the 15th greatest player in Portsmouth's history.

James captained Portsmouth in the FA Cup semi-final against Tottenham Hotspur where Portsmouth won 2–0 in extra time, describing the experience as "superb". He also captained the team in the final as Portsmouth were beaten 1–0 by double winners Chelsea.

His contract expired at the end of the 2009–10 season, and he expressed interest in succeeding Avram Grant as Portsmouth manager, though this came to nothing. The club offered him a new playing contract, but withdrew the offer after he failed to commit to the club; therefore, James left Portsmouth and became a free agent.

Bristol City 

James signed a one-year contract with Championship side Bristol City on 30 July 2010, with the option of a second year. He stated that he hoped that his performances at the club would keep him on the radar for the England team and that his decision to join them was motivated by a desire to be closer to his family home in Devon.

James' league debut for Bristol City came on 7 August 2010 in a 3–0 defeat to Millwall. On 11 February 2011, the eve of his 850th club appearance, James announced he had signed a contract extension with the club until June 2012. On 10 March 2012, James reached 900 club appearances in a game against Cardiff City in the Severnside derby, in which he was made captain as a mark of respect.

He was released by Bristol City on 1 May 2012, and in July 2012 began training with Exeter City.

AFC Bournemouth 
On 27 September 2012, he arrived at Dean Court to train with AFC Bournemouth, signing a one-year deal to play for them the following day. However, he did not see out the contract, leaving the club by mutual consent in March 2013 after making 19 appearances.

ÍBV Vestmannaeyjar 
On 2 April 2013, James signed a contract with Icelandic club ÍBV until the end of the 2013 season in a joint player/coach capacity. He linked up with former Portsmouth teammate Hermann Hreiðarsson, the manager of ÍBV. The ÍBV chairman stated that James was not being paid high wages, and that he was primarily playing out of kindness and to gain coaching experience. His arrival at ÍBV saw much higher attendances than in previous years. ÍBV ended the season in sixth position, and James announced his retirement from playing.

Kerala Blasters and retirement 
He was signed by Kerala Blasters FC, owned by Sachin Tendulkar, for the 2014 Indian Super League season as a player-manager. He said "I hope my involvement with ISL will be the start of something great." The team's first fixture on 13 October, in which James played, resulted in a 1–0 defeat at NorthEast United. His team eventually became the runners up in the inaugural ISL tournament by losing to Atletico de Kolkata 1–0 in the finals. James retired at the end of the season.

International career

Youth career and early senior career 
After making one England under-21 appearance whilst at Watford, James made his full debut for Glenn Hoddle's England in a friendly against Mexico on 29 March 1997 when he was a Liverpool player. He kept his first international clean sheet as England beat Mexico 2–0 with goals from Teddy Sheringham and James' Liverpool teammate Robbie Fowler. He was in the provisional 28-man squad for Euro 2000 before missing the final cut.

James is the only black goalkeeper to represent England as a full international.

Years of rotation and Euro 2004 
James was selected by Sven-Göran Eriksson for his 23-man squad for the 2002 FIFA World Cup. He was third choice behind David Seaman and Nigel Martyn, as the veteran Arsenal goalkeeper played in all five of England's games.

For several years he had to play understudy to England's regular keeper, David Seaman. When Seaman was dropped after making a mistake against FYR Macedonia in 2002, James became the new England number one. He retained his place in the England team even after West Ham's relegation to the First Division in 2003, and was the only player from outside the top flight to win an England cap between 1999 (Michael Gray) and 2007 (David Nugent). He went on to play in all of England's matches at Euro 2004.

James was dropped from the starting XI, his place being taken by Tottenham's Paul Robinson. James came on as a half-time substitute and conceded all four goals in the 4–1 drubbing England suffered at the hands of Denmark during a friendly on 17 August 2005 – their worst defeat in 25 years. James still remained part of the England squad, and was selected as the second-choice goalkeeper behind Robinson for the 2006 World Cup in Germany, though he did not play.

Along with fellow veterans David Beckham and Sol Campbell, James was dropped from the England squad at the start of Steve McClaren's reign and was not called up during the 2006–07 season. He was recalled for the friendly with Germany on 22 August 2007, over a year since first being omitted. James played the whole of the second half of England's 2–1 defeat to Germany as a substitute for Robinson. In so doing, he became the first Portsmouth player to play for the senior England team since Mark Hateley in 1984. However, Scott Carson was chosen ahead of both James and Robinson for the decisive Euro 2008 qualifier against Croatia on 21 November 2007. England lost the match 2-3, partly due to a fumble by Carson, which gifted Croatia the game's opening goal. Following England's failure to qualify for Euro 2008 McClaren was sacked as England manager and replaced by Fabio Capello. James was subsequently critical of McClaren's treatment of England's goalkeepers.

2010 World Cup cycle 
On 7 February 2008, James was selected as goalkeeper for Capello's first match in charge, a friendly against Switzerland. It was his first start for England since a friendly with Colombia in May 2005. James firmly re-established himself as England's first choice goalkeeper, starting in each of Capello's first 13 games in charge. Persistent injury problems over the following year left James' hopes of retaining the No. 1 spot for the 2010 World Cup in doubt, with Capello stating he would only consider players who were 100% fit for his squad. After the World Cup qualifier against Ukraine on 1 April 2009, James did not start a match for England until the final friendly before the World Cup against Japan on 30 May 2010.

Prior to the tournament, James was backed to reclaim the number one shirt by former England goalkeepers Gordon Banks and David Seaman.

On 3 June 2010, it was confirmed that James would be travelling to the World Cup Finals in South Africa, and would be allocated the number 1 jersey. He was the oldest footballer in the tournament. James was not selected for the first game of the World Cup against the United States, with Robert Green instead starting in the England goal. However, Green made an error that allowed Clint Dempsey to score an equaliser that resulted in the game being drawn. James returned to the starting line-up in the next game, keeping a clean sheet against Algeria on 18 June 2010. In doing so James became the oldest ever World Cup debutant at 39 years and 321 days old. Five days later, he kept another clean sheet as England won against Slovenia 1–0 to ensure that they would reach the last 16, although they finished second in Group C behind the United States. They were eliminated in the following round after a 4–1 defeat to Germany.

Style of play 
Considered to be one of England's greatest goalkeepers, James was an aggressive and imposing goalkeeper, who was known for his excellent shot-stopping ability and ability to produce long throws, as well as his professionalism, leadership, and ability to organise his defence; however, he also came under criticism in the media for his perceived poor decision–making and distribution with his feet, although he was able to improve upon this aspect of his game as his career progressed. His ability to claim crosses was also cited as a weakness in his gameplay. His inconsistency and error–prone performances led to him being nicknamed "Calamity James" in the media. In his youth, his role model was Italian goalkeeper Dino Zoff.

Coaching career 
Commenting on the comparatively low numbers of black players who become managers in English football, James said in 2012 that "I struggle with the racist issue in football because I don't see it, and that's not because I've got my head in the sand. In the earlier days, yes, but the game's changed...If you don't want to go, an [sic] moan about not getting jobs, well, probably because you haven't been on the course is the reason why you haven't got a job."

ÍBV 
James served as a player-coach for manager Hermann Hreiðarsson at ÍBV in the Icelandic Úrvalsdeild karla during the 2013 season.

Luton Town 
Following his stint at ÍBV, James joined Luton Town in October 2013 in a coaching capacity in order to gain experience towards a UEFA A-licence qualification.

Kerala Blasters 
James was the player-manager of Kerala Blasters FC in the Indian Super League 2014 season. Utilising a distinctly British identity, signing players such as Stephen Pearson and Michael Chopra, he took them to the ISL playoffs at the first attempt, after a 4th-place finish in the league phase. In the playoffs, extra time was needed to see off Chennaiyin 4–3 on aggregate, taking James and Kerala Blasters to the 2014 Indian Super League final, only to lose 1–0 to Atlético de Kolkata. James left the club at the end of his contract.

James returned to the helm of the club as their head coach a day after the sacking of Rene Meulensteen on 3 January 2018, following a string of poor performances. He set about rebuilding the side in the January transfer window, releasing Mark Sifneos and signing Iceland international midfielder Guðjón Baldvinsson on loan from Stjarnan, along with appointing former Portsmouth teammate Hermann Hreiðarsson as his assistant. Despite overseeing a turnaround in form, he could only guide the Blasters to 6th place at the end the 2017–18 Indian Super League season, missing out on the play-offs.

The club started the 2018–19 Indian Super League season with a victory, beating ATK 2–0 at Salt Lake Stadium. However this was followed by an 11-match winless run, which resulted in James' sacking in December 2018

Þróttur Vogum 
In July 2020, James served as an assistant coach to Hermann Hreiðarsson with Icelandic club Þróttur Vogum for one game.

Personal life 

James was brought up in Welwyn Garden City, attending the Sir Frederic Osborn School. He is of mixed Jamaican and English descent, and spent part of his childhood in Jamaica. He has four children with his former wife Tanya, whom he divorced in 2005, and as of June 2007 lived in Chudleigh, Devon with his partner, Amanda Salmon.

James has gained attention for modelling assignments, first with Giorgio Armani in 1995, and with H&M in 2005.

James was known for experimenting with his hairstyle. In May 2007, a "Who Ate All the Pies" column ridiculed him, among David Beckham and others, for "backcombed efforts", and likened a previous November 2006 cut to fictional character Clark Kent, both captured by BBC Match of the Day.

During the 2003 off-season, James was a guest at the training camp of American football team the Miami Dolphins, where he studied their training and conditioning methods.

James was a 20-a-day smoker during his early career, having taken up the habit while sidelined with injury at the age of 15 and quit for the new millennium. He fronted an anti-smoking campaign in 2008.

Charity work 
In 2005, James visited the south eastern African nation of Malawi to help raise AIDS awareness. He subsequently set up the David James Foundation in order to help maize farmers in Malawi develop more efficient production techniques. The foundation also aims to give teenagers the skills, such as mechanical and construction skills, needed to go out and work. James has also made connections with West Exe Technology College, Exeter. This college has brought to his attention the Malawian charity, Friends of Mulanje Orphans. The foundation funds the David James Foundation Scholarship at the University of Westminster, which funds a student from Malawi to study for a master's degree at Westminster. The charity has been supported by the Institution of Chemical Engineers (IChemE). James is also a global ambassador for the Special Olympics and works with Access Sport to provide sports provision in deprived areas of the United Kingdom.

Art and writing 
James is an avid artist, and has auctioned several of his paintings for charity.

In addition to being an art lover, he writes a regular column for The Observer newspaper, and donates his article fee to charity. James was also the illustrator on the children's book Harry's Magic Pockets: The Circus written by his friend, Steve Pearson.

Bankruptcy 
In May 2014 James was declared bankrupt. Despite earning an estimated £20m from his footballing career, owning several properties and having a lucrative contract modeling for Armani, James' debts had built up since his divorce from his wife, Tanya, in 2005.

In November 2014, James placed for sale hundreds of items of football memorabilia collected during his career, to pay off the debts. Items included 150 signed shirts, shorts and match balls as well as his customised Vauxhall Astra van and Raleigh Chopper bikes.

Media career 
Shortly before Euro 2012, James presented a BBC programme entitled Euro's Most Shocking Moments alongside Richard Bacon. He was also a pundit for the channel at the tournament in Poland and Ukraine.

James was one of BT Sport's first pundits in 2013. James worked as a pundit for Eurosport at the 2014 FIFA World Cup, and for India's Sony Ten at the 2018 FIFA World Cup. On 6 June 2021, James presented Football Scores with David James on classical music radio station Scala Radio.

James was a contestant on the seventeenth series of Strictly Come Dancing in 2019. He was partnered with Nadiya Bychkova and was the fourth celebrity to be eliminated after a dance-off with Mike Bushell and Katya Jones.

James has been a guest on television game shows, including Countdown (2016), Go 8 Bit (2016), Richard Osman's House of Games (2020) and Celebrity Catchphrase (2021). In March 2021, he won £1,250 for a homeless people's charity on Pointless Celebrities. In 2022, James competed on Celebrity Mastermind with his specialist subject being the artist Roy Lichtenstein.

Career statistics

Club

International

Managerial

Honours 
Liverpool
 Football League Cup: 1994–95

Portsmouth
 FA Cup: 2007–08

AFC Bournemouth
Football League One runner-up: 2012–13

Individual
PFA Team of the Year: 1991–92 Second Division, 1995–96 Premier League, 2007–08 Premier League
 Toulon Tournament Best Goalkeeper: 1991

See also 
 List of men's footballers with the most official appearances

References

External links 

 
 
 
 
 David James index at Sportingheroes.net 
 BBC profile 
 
 

1970 births
Living people
Sportspeople from Welwyn Garden City
English people of Jamaican descent
Black British sportsmen
English footballers
Association football goalkeepers
Members of the Order of the British Empire
Watford F.C. players
Liverpool F.C. players
Aston Villa F.C. players
Manchester City F.C. players
West Ham United F.C. players
Portsmouth F.C. players
Bristol City F.C. players
AFC Bournemouth players
Íþróttabandalag Vestmannaeyja players
Kerala Blasters FC players
English Football League players
Premier League players
Indian Super League marquee players
Indian Super League players
English expatriate footballers
Expatriate footballers in Iceland
Expatriate footballers in India
England under-21 international footballers
England B international footballers
England international footballers
2002 FIFA World Cup players
UEFA Euro 2004 players
2006 FIFA World Cup players
2010 FIFA World Cup players
The Guardian journalists
English football managers
English expatriate football managers
Expatriate football managers in India
Indian Super League head coaches
Kerala Blasters FC head coaches
Association football goalkeeping coaches
FA Cup Final players
English expatriate sportspeople in Iceland
English expatriate sportspeople in India
Association football coaches